Goetze's Candy Company, Inc. (pronounced gets) is an American confectionery company based in Baltimore, Maryland specializing in caramel-based candies. Goetze's was established in 1895 as the Baltimore Chewing Gum Company by August Goetze and his son, William. In 1917, the family developed a soft, caramel candy (known as "Chu-ees") which ultimately evolved into their signature candy, Caramel Creams (also known as Bull's Eyes), a soft chewy caramel with cream filling in the center. Each candy is packaged in a clear wrapper and twisted at two red and white ends.

Products

In addition to its signature caramel candy, the company also makes a different style of its classic caramel candy, Cow Tales. Goetze's Cow Tales were originally launched in the year 1984. Cow Tales are similar to the Caramel Creams, but in the form of a long, thin cylinder of soft caramel with a cream center. Cow Tales are also produced in Vanilla, Chocolate, Strawberry, and Caramel Apple flavors. In addition, the company offers Mini Cow Tales, a bite-sized version of Vanilla Cow Tales, Goetze's number-one selling 25-cent item.

Over the years, the company experimented with several flavors, such as peanut butter and banana. , the Caramel Creams lineup included "Original" (Vanilla), Chocolate, Strawberry, and Caramel Apple flavors.

According to the manufacturer, Goetze's caramels have always been made with a low fat, low sodium, no cholesterol recipe and are made with wheat flour, dairy milk and cream ingredients.

Honors 
In 1984, R. Melvin Goetze, a third-generation family member (who joined the company in 1935), was inducted into the Candy Hall of Fame by the National Confectionery Sales Association of America. Spaulding A. Goetze Sr. was inducted into the Candy Hall of Fame in 1998.  Rick LaRue, Goetze's former National Sales Manager, was inducted into the Candy Hall of Fame while working at Goetze's, in October 2006. and Tony Gazzola, one of Goetze's Regional Sales Managers, was inducted into the Candy Hall of Fame while working at Goetze's, in October 2007. Mitchell Goetze, one of the fifth generation family members, became the Executive Vice Chairman of the National Confectioners Association in 2008, and became the Chairman of the NCA two years later. John Leipold, Goetze's Director Sales & Marketing, was inducted into the Candy Hall of Fame in October 2009.

References

Further reading

External links

 Goetze's Candy official website

Brand name confectionery
Confectionery companies of the United States
Privately held companies based in Maryland
Cuisine of Baltimore